Shuangta Township is a township of Minquan County in northeastern Henan province, China, situated along China National Highway 310 and just north of G30 Lianyungang–Khorgas Expressway about  west-northwest of the county seat. , it has 28 villages under its administration. The township is also part of the border between the prefecture-level cities of Shangqiu and Kaifeng.

See also 
 List of township-level divisions of Henan

References 

Township-level divisions of Henan